Javad Jalali (born 30 May 1977 in Mashhad) is a photographer and a member of the Iranian Alliance of Motion Picture Guilds. His photograph of the movie Farewell Baghdad is now kept in the Iranian Artists Forum in Tehran, Iran. He also holds the record for a photograph sold for the highest amount at a photography expo in Iran (800,000,000 rials).

Jalali is known for his photography of refugees and immigrants of Afghanistan and Kurdistan in Iraq (2008, 2011), mysticism in Iranian architecture (2001), traditional Iranian kilns (2004, 2008, 2011), mentally and physically ill patients (2003, 2004), abstract photography of horses and trees and still photography of films. His photographs have been published in Variety (2012), Real Time Arts (Australia) (2011), L'Uomo Vogue (2011), D Photo Journal (Australia) (2010, 2011), Vogue (Italy) (2010), MyFDB (Italy) (2010), Paradise Magazine (2010), Film International (2010), "World of Cinema" (2008, 2010), Cinema Weekly (2007–2011), Cinema Industry (2008–2011), Film Magazine (2008, 2009, 2010), Picture World (2009, 2010), Ideal Life (2009), Screen Cannes (France) (2009) and Cinemotion (France) (2009).

He was the cameraman for the movie Boghz which was filmed in Turkey and directed by Reza Darmishian. Touraj Aslani, the movie's cinematographer, explains that he chose Javad Jalali because of his knowledge and understanding of colors, motions and photography. He added that the movie was filmed using two cameras, either narrating its own look or jump cuts of the movie. This form of filming is a new experience in Iranian cinema. He was also nominated for an award at the Fajr Film Festival for the movie and the behind-the-scenes photography of Aal and Endless Dreams. He was recognized by the jury of the 29th Fajr International Film Festival for Endless Dreams.

For the first time in the history of film photography, one of his photos is kept in the National Museum of the Iranian artist's forum. His collection of picture stories from the movie Farewell Baghdad went on to be displayed in Melat Multiplex. In this exhibition, photographs of the movie and the behind the scene of Farewell Baghdad were shown in photo art format. It was a combination of photographs and the soundtrack of the movie. The photographs alongside the soundtrack were a conceptual event for the audience.

At the 25th Isfahan International Festival of Films for Children & Young Adults, he received a Golden Butterfly for the best photograph of the movie. Javad Jalali received the Crystal Simorgh at 30th Fajr International Film Festival for the best photography of the movie Farewell Baghdad. He received his second Crystal Simorgh at the 32nd Fajr International Film Festival for the best photography of the movie Berlin Minus Seven.

Awards and honors

 Crystal Trophy Award, and diploma best short film story for the film highway 2000
 Nominated for the Academy of Fine Arts Boston
 Nominated for the Academy of Fine Arts France
 Actual Photo Expo theater and Iranian 2011
 Nominated Crystal Phoenix best scene twenty-ninth Fajr Film Festival for the movie Sleep Comet
 Winner, Crystal Simorgh, Best Photo, 30th Fajr International Film Festival for Farewell Baghdad
Winner, Golden Butterfly, Best Photo, 25th Isfahan International Festival of Films for Children & Young Adults
Nominee, Crystal Simorgh, Best Photo the scene, 29th Fajr International Film Festival, for Aal
Nominee, Crystal Simorgh, Best Photo the scene, 29th Fajr International Film Festival, for Endless Dreams
Nominee, Crystal Simorgh, Best Photo behind the scene, 29th Fajr International Film Festival, for Aal
Nominee, Best Photo, 15th Iran Cinema Celebration Awards, for Farewell Baghdad
Winner, Crystal Simorgh, Best Photo, 32nd Fajr International Film Festival for Berlin Minus Seven
 Jury member of 35th Fajr International Film Festival
Winner, Crystal Simorgh, Best Photo, 36th Fajr International Film Festival for Parinaz
 Jury member of 5th still potographer Khanehcinema festival

Sample subject gallery

References

Further reading

 Iranartists's Interview With Javad Jalali
 Caffecinema's Interview With Javad Jalali
 Tehran e Emrooz's Interview With Javad Jalali
 Isna's Interview With Javad Jalali
 Cinemapress's Interview With Javad Jalali

External links
 
 
 Javad Jalali at Cinemotions
 Javad Jalali's Photos from Farewell Baghdad movie in caffecinema
 The official Photographers Directory 
 Machine Encounter By Javad Jalali in IMDb
 Javad Instagram

1977 births
Living people
Iranian cinematographers
Iranian photographers
People from Mashhad